This is a list of broadcast television stations that are licensed in the U.S. state of Utah.

Note: Salt Lake City is the only television market in the state of Utah.

Full-power stations
VC refers to the station's PSIP virtual channel. RF refers to the station's physical RF channel.

Defunct full-power stations

Channel 3: KCBU – Ind. – Price (2003–2009)
Channel 9: KVOG-TV, KOET – Ind., ETV – Ogden (12/5/1960 – 1973)
Channel 11: KLOR-TV – Provo/Salt Lake City (12/17/1958 – 3/13/1960)
Channel 12: KUSU-TV – NET/PBS – Logan (3/16/1964–11/14/1970)
Channel 18: KWCS-TV – ETV – Ogden (10/11/1960 – 1971)

LPTV stations

Translators

See also
List of Salt Lake City media
List of radio stations in Utah
List of newspapers in Utah

Utah
 
Television stations in Utah